is a Japanese footballer currently playing as a midfielder for Albirex Niigata of J2 League.

Career statistics

Club

Notes

References

External links

2000 births
Living people
Association football people from Gunma Prefecture
Japanese footballers
Association football midfielders
J2 League players
J3 League players
Albirex Niigata players
Azul Claro Numazu players